An internally displaced person (IDP) is someone who is forced to leave their home but who remains within their country's borders. They are often referred to as refugees, although they do not fall within the legal definitions of a refugee.

At the end of 2014, it was estimated there were 38.2 million IDPs worldwide, the highest level since 1989, the first year for which global statistics on IDPs are available. As of 3 May 2022 the countries with the largest IDP populations were Ukraine (8 million), Syria (7.6 million), Ethiopia (5.5 million), the Democratic Republic of the Congo (5.2 million), Colombia (4.9 million), Yemen (4.3 million), Afghanistan (3.8 million), Iraq (3.6 million), Sudan (2.2 million), South Sudan (1.9 million), Pakistan (1.4 million), Nigeria (1.2 million) and Somalia (1.1 million).

The United Nations and the UNHCR support monitoring and analysis of worldwide IDPs through the Geneva-based Internal Displacement Monitoring Centre.

Definition
Whereas 'refugee' has an authoritative definition under the 1951 Refugee Convention, there is no universal legal definition of internally displaced persons (IDP); only a regional treaty for African countries (see Kampala Convention). However, a United Nations report, Guiding Principles on Internal Displacement uses the definition of: 
persons or groups of persons who have been forced or obliged to flee or to leave their homes or places of habitual residence, in particular as a result of or in order to avoid the effects of armed conflict, situations of generalized violence, violations of human rights or natural or human-made disasters, and who have not crossed an internationally recognized State border.

While the above stresses two important elements of internal displacement (coercion and the domestic/internal movement), it is important to note that, rather than a strict definition, the Guiding Principles offer "a descriptive identification of the category of persons whose needs are the concern of the Guiding Principles". In this way, the document "intentionally steers toward flexibility rather than legal precision" as the words "in particular" indicate that the list of reasons for displacement is not exhaustive. However, as Erin Mooney has pointed out, "global statistics on internal displacement generally count only IDPs uprooted by conflict and human rights violations. Moreover, a recent study has recommended that the IDP concept should be defined even more narrowly, to be limited to persons displaced by violence." Thus, despite the non-exhaustive reasons for internal displacement, many consider IDPs as those who would be defined as refugees if they were to cross an international border, hence, the term refugees in all but the name is often applied to IDPs.

IDP populations
It is very difficult to get accurate figures for internally displaced persons because populations are not constant. IDPs may be returning home while others are fleeing, and others may periodically return to IDP camps to take advantage of humanitarian aid. While the case of IDPs in large camps such as those in Darfur, western Sudan, are relatively well-reported, it is very difficult to assess those IDPs who flee to larger towns and cities. It is necessary for many instances to supplement official figures with additional information obtained from operational humanitarian organizations on the ground.  Thus, the 24.5 million figure must be treated as an estimate. Additionally, most official figures only include those displaced by conflict or natural disasters.  Development-induced IDPs often are not included in assessments. It has been estimated that between 70 and 80% of all IDPs are women and children.

50% of internally displaced people and refugees were thought to be in urban areas in 2010, many of them in protracted displacement with little likelihood of ever returning home. A 2013 study found that these protracted urban displacements had not been given due weight by international aid and governance as historically they had focused on rural cam displacement responses. The study argues that this protracted urban displacement needs a fundamental change in the approach to those who are displaced and their host societies. They note that re-framing responses to urban displacement will also involve human rights and development actors and local and national governments. They call for a change in the narrative around the issue is needed to reflect ingenuity and fortitude displayed by displaced populations, the opportunities for self-sufficiency and safety represented by urban areas, and that the displaced can make a contribution to their host societies. An updated country by country breakdown can be found online.

Notable IDP camps
 There are many IDP camps in Nigeria and especially many IDP camps in Borno State.
 Until recently there were many IDP camps in Sri Lanka.

Protection and assistance
The problem of protecting and assisting IDPs is not a new issue.  In international law it is the responsibility of the government concerned to provide assistance and protection for the IDPs in their country.  However, as many of the displaced are a result of civil conflict and violence or where the authority of the central state is in doubt, there is no local authority willing to provide assistance and protection. It has been estimated that some 5 million IDPs in 11 countries are "without any significant humanitarian assistance from their governments." Under these circumstances rehabilitation policies on humanitarian grounds should be aimed at reducing inequality of opportunity among these vulnerable groups by integrating them into local social services and allowing them access to jobs, education, and healthcare opportunities; otherwise new conflicts might break out.

Unlike the case of refugees, there is no international humanitarian institution which has the overall responsibility of protecting and assisting the refugees as well as the internally displaced. A number of organizations have stepped into the breach in specific circumstances.

UNHCR
The Office of the United Nations High Commissioner for Refugees (UNHCR) was mandated by General Assembly Resolution 428 (V) of 14 December 1950 to "lead and coordinate international action for the worldwide protection of refugees and the resolution of refugee problems.... guided by the 1951 United Nations Convention Relating to the Status of Refugees and its 1967 Protocol." The UNHCR has traditionally argued that it does not have an exclusive mandate for IDPs even though at least since 1972 it had relief and rehabilitation programs for those displaced within a country.  Until the mid-2000s, it conditioned involvement to cases where there is a specific request by the UN Secretary-General and with the consent of the State concerned it has been willing to respond by assisting IDPs in a given instance.  In 2005 it was helping some 5.6 million IDPs (out of over 25 million), but only about 1.1 million in Africa. 

In 2005, the UNHCR signed an agreement with other humanitarian agencies. "Under this agreement, UNHCR will assume the lead responsibility for protection, emergency shelter and camp management for internally displaced people." In 2019, UNHCR issued an updated IDP policy that reaffirms its commitment to engaging decisively and predictably in situations of internal displacement.

ICRC
The International Committee of the Red Cross has a mandate of ensuring the application of international humanitarian law as it affects civilians in the midst of armed conflict.  They have traditionally not distinguished between civilians who are internally displaced and those who remain in their homes.  In a 2006 policy statement, the ICRC stated: 
The ICRC's overall objective is to alleviate the suffering of people who are caught up in armed conflict and other situations of violence. To that end, the organization strives to provide effective and efficient assistance and protection for such persons, be they displaced or not, while taking into consideration the action of other humanitarian organizations. On the basis of its long experience in different parts of the world, the ICRC has defined an operational approach towards the civilian population as a whole that is designed to meet the most urgent humanitarian needs of both displaced persons and local and host communities.
However, its Director of Operations has earlier recognized that IDPs "deprived of shelter and their habitual sources of food, water, medicine and money, they have different, and often more urgent, material needs."

Collaborative approach
The previous system set up internationally to address the needs of IDPs was referred to as the collaborative approach as the responsibility for protecting and assisting IDPs was shared among the UN agencies, i.e. UNHCR, Unicef, WFP, UNDP, Office of the High Commissioner for Human Rights, the International Organization for Migration (IOM), the ICRC and international NGOs. Coordination is the responsibility of the UN Emergency Relief Coordinator and the Humanitarian Coordinator in the country concerned. They are assisted by the Inter-Agency Displacement Division, which was created in 2004 and is housed in the UN Office for the Coordination of Humanitarian Affairs (OCHA).

The original collaborative approach has come under increasing criticism. Roberta Cohen reports: 
Nearly every UN and independent evaluation has found the collaborative approach deficient when it comes to IDPs. To begin with, there is no real focus of responsibility in the field for assisting and protecting... There is also no predictability of action, as the different agencies are free to pick and choose the situations in which they wish to become involved on the basis of their respective mandates, resources, and interests. In every new emergency, no one knows for sure which agency or combination thereof will become involved.In 2005 there was an attempt to fix the problem by giving sectoral responsibilities to different humanitarian agencies, most notably with the UNHCR taking on the responsibility for the protection and the management of camps and emergency shelters. The Forced Migration Review stated that the "abnegation of responsibility is possible because there is no formal responsibility apportioned to agencies under the Collaborative Response, and thus no accountability when agencies renege on their promises."

Similarly, research on refugees has suggested a cross-sector collaboration as a key means to assist displaced people.

Cluster approach

The cluster approach designates individual agencies as ‘sector leaders’ to coordinate operations in specific areas to try to plug those newly identified gaps. The cluster approach was conceived amid concerns about coordination and capacity that arose from the weak operational response to the crisis in Darfur in 2004 and 2005, and the critical findings of the Humanitarian Response Review (HRR) commissioned by the then ERC, Jan Egeland. Egeland called for strengthening the leadership of the sectors, and introduced the concept of "clusters" at different levels (headquarters, regional, country and operational)’.

The cluster approach operates on the global and local levels. At the global level, the approach is meant to build up capacity in eleven key ‘gap’ areas by developing better surge capacity, ensuring consistent access to appropriately trained technical expertise and enhanced material stockpiles, and securing the increased engagement of all relevant humanitarian partners. At the field level, the cluster approach strengthens the coordination and response capacity by mobilizing clusters of humanitarian agencies (UN/Red Cross-Red Crescent/IOs/NGOs) to respond in particular sectors or areas of activity, each cluster having a clearly designated and accountable lead, as agreed by the HC and the Country Team. Designated lead agencies at the global level both participate directly in operations, but also coordinate with and oversee other organizations within their specific spheres, reporting the results up through a designated chain of command to the ERC at the summit. However, lead agencies are responsible as "providers of last resort", which represents the commitment of cluster leads to do their utmost to ensure an adequate and appropriate response in their respective areas of responsibility. The cluster approach was part of a package of reforms accepted by the IASC in December 2005 and subsequently applied in eight chronic humanitarian crises and six sudden-onset emergencies. However, the reform was originally rolled out and evaluated in four countries: DRC, Liberia, Somalia and Uganda.

The clusters were originally concentrated in nine areas: 
 Logistics (WFP)
 Emergency Telecommunications Cluster (WFP)
Camp Coordination and Camp Management (UNHCR for conflict-generated IDPs and IOM for natural disaster-generated IDPs)
 Shelter (IFRC for natural disasters; UNHCR for conflict situations)
 Health (WHO)
 Nutrition (UNICEF)
 Water, sanitation, and hygiene promotion (UNICEF)
 Early recovery (UNDP); and
 Protection (UNHCR for conflict-generated IDPs, UNHCR, UNICEF, and OHCHR for natural disaster-generated IDPs).

IASC Principles deemed it unnecessary to apply the cluster approach to four sectors where no significant gaps were detected: a) food, led by WFP; b) refugees, led by UNHCR; c) education, led by UNICEF; and d) agriculture, led by FAO.

The original nine clusters were later expanded to include agriculture and education.

International law
Unlike the case of refugees, there is no international universal treaty which applies specifically to IDPs. Only a regional treaty for African countries has been established (see Kampala Convention). Some other countries have advocated re-thinking the definitions and protections for refugees to apply to IDPs, but so far no solid actions have come to fruition. Recognizing the gap, the UN Secretary-General, Boutros-Ghali appointed Francis Deng in 1992 as his representative for internally displaced persons.  Besides acting as an advocate for IDPs, Deng set out in 1994, at the request of the UN General Assembly to examine and bring together existing international laws which relate to the protection of IDPs. The result of this work was the document, Guiding Principles on Internal Displacement.

The Guiding Principles lay out the responsibilities of states before displacement – that is, to prevent displacement – during and after displacement. They have been endorsed by the UN General Assembly, the African Commission on Human and People's Rights (ACHPR) and by the signatories to the 2006 Pact on Security, Stability and Development in the Great Lakes Region, which include Sudan, DRC and Uganda.

The Guiding Principles, however, are non-binding. As Bahame Tom Nyanduga, Special Rapporteur on Refugees, IDPs and Asylum Seekers in Africa for the ACHPR has stated, "the absence of a binding international legal regime on internal displacement is a grave lacuna in international law."

In September 2004 the Secretary-General of the UN showed the continuing concern of his office by appointing Walter Kälin as his Representative on the Human Rights of Internally Displaced Persons.  Part of his mandate includes the promoting of the Guiding Principles.

Right of return 
In so-called "post-conflict" situations, there has traditionally been an emphasis in the international community to seek to return to the pre-war status quo. However, opinions are gradually changing, because violent conflict destroys political, economic and social structures and new structures develop as a result, quite often irreversibly. Furthermore, returning to the pre-war status-quo may actually be undesirable if pre-war structures led to the conflict in the first place, or prevented its early resolution. IDPs' and refugees' right of return can represent one of the most complex aspects of this issue.

Normally, pressure is applied by the international community and humanitarian organization to ensure displaced people are able to return to their areas of origin and the same property. The UN Principles for Housing and Property Restitution for Refugees and IDPs, otherwise known as the Pinheiro Principles, provides guidance on the management of the technical and legal aspects of housing, land and property (HLP) restitution. Restitution rights are of key importance to IDPs and refugees around the world, and important to try preventing aggressors benefiting from conflict. However, without a clear understanding of each local context, full restitution rights can be unworkable and fail to protect the people it is designed to protect for the following reasons, refugees and IDPs:
 may never have had property (e.g. in Afghanistan);
 cannot access what property they have (Colombia, Guatemala, South Africa and Sudan);
 ownership is unclear as families have expanded or split and division of the land becomes an issue;
 death of the owner may leave dependents without a clear claim to the land;
 people settled on the land know it is not theirs but have nowhere else to go (as in Colombia, Rwanda and Timor-Leste); and
 have competing claims with others, including the state and its foreign or local business partners (as in Aceh, Angola, Colombia, Liberia and Sudan)

Researchers at the Overseas Development Institute stress the need for humanitarian organization to develop greater expertise in these issues, using experts who have knowledge in both humanitarian and land and property issues and so provide better advice to state actors seeking to resolve these issues. The ODI calls on humanitarian agencies to develop an awareness of sustainable reintegration as part of their emphasis on returning IDPs and refugees home. Legal advice needs to be provided to all parties involved even if a framework is created in which to resolve these issues.

See also
Asylum seekers
Internal colonialism
Internally displaced persons in Iraq
Internal migration
Internal passport
Kampala Convention
Refugees
Refugee employment

Notes

References
The Office of the UN High Commissioner for Refugees (UNHCR), Refugees by Numbers.
Ilaria Bottigliero, "Displaced Persons Caught between War and Peace in Asia", 2 ISIL Yearbook of International Humanitarian and Refugee Law (2002), pp. 117–133.

External links

 Internal Displacement Monitoring Centre (IDMC), Norwegian Refugee Council
 The Guiding Principles on Internal Displacement, UNHCR
 IDP Action
 Website of the UN Representative of the Secretary-General on internally displaced persons
 Brookings-Bern Project on Internal Displacement
 Forced Migration Online provides access to information resources, including a searchable digital library consisting of full-text documents
 Urban IDPs Online documentation platform on IDPs living in urban areas
 Forced Migration Review magazine with regular IDP news
 World 'forgets' internal refugees, BBC News Online, 5 November 2005
 Photojournalist's Account - Images of displacement in Sudan
 Refugee Law Project, Ugandan organisation working with IDPs
 Women's Commission for Refugee Women and Children
 "New Rights, Old Wrongs: Colombia has eased some abortion restrictions—but displaced women still suffer" Winter 2007 article in Ms. magazine about how the conflict in Colombia is affecting the health and rights of IDP women
"Visiting the IDP camps in Northern Uganda" : Malcolm Trevena's account of visiting the IDP camps in Kitgum, Northern Uganda
"Emergency Response Unit - IDPs Pakistan" IDP camps and latest IDP updates from Pakistan
"the CCCM Haiti Cluster website" Natural Disaster - IDP situation and updates from Haiti
The Internal Displacement Monitoring Centre

Persecution
Forced migration
Articles containing video clips
Refugees by type
Internal migration